Travis Lamar Robinson (born 30 November 1994) is a Bahamian Free National Movement politician who was the Member of Parliament (MP) for Bain and Grants Town from 2017 to 2021. Elected at the age of 22, he became the youngest MP in the history of the Bahamas as well as CARICOM at large.

Early life and education
Robinson was born in the local area to Samuel and Maxine Robinson and raised by his adoptive mother, Ianne Seymour-Bain. He attended and was Head Boy at Stephen Dillet Primary, T.A. Thompson Junior High, and C.R. Walker Senior High School. He graduated with a Bachelor of Science in Tourism Management from the University of the Bahamas. He has taken and led courses with the United Nations and Royal Bahamian Defence Force, and sat on the Culinary Hospitality Management Institute Senate.

Career
Robinson got involved in politics at a young age, serving two terms in the Bahamian Youth Parliament. He founded the tourism consultant firm Consult Tourism Bahamas Ltd as well as the Rising Star Organization.

Robinson defeated the incumbent since 2007 Bernard Nottage in the 2017 general election with a majority of over 1 thousand votes.

He was appointed Parliamentary Secretary for the Ministry of Tourism and Aviation from 2017. He was removed from the cabinet alongside Frederick McAlpine in 2018 for voting against the government's 12% rise in VAT, but then reappointed in 2020.

References

Living people
1994 births
Free National Movement politicians
Government ministers of the Bahamas
Members of the Parliament of the Bahamas
People in tourism
University of the Bahamas alumni